"Without Your Love" is a song recorded by American country music artist Aaron Tippin.  It was released in February 1996 as the second single from the album Tool Box.  the song reached #22 on the Billboard Hot Country Singles & Tracks chart.  The song was written by Al Anderson and Craig Wiseman.

Chart performance

References

1996 singles
1996 songs
Aaron Tippin songs
Songs written by Al Anderson (NRBQ)
Songs written by Craig Wiseman
RCA Records singles